Gamasellus tuvinycus is a species of mite in the family Ologamasidae.

References

tuvinycus
Articles created by Qbugbot
Animals described in 1982